Quadrisphaera granulorum is a Gram-positive species of bacteria that has been isolated from sludge biomass from Singapore.

References

Actinomycetia
Bacteria described in 2005